David Zenoff (March 8, 1916 – October 3, 2005) was an American judge from Nevada.

Born in Amherst, Wisconsin, Zenoff received his law degree from the University of Wisconsin. He served as a major in the United States Marine Corps during World War II, earning a Bronze Star. He moved to Las Vegas, Nevada, and was admitted to the Nevada bar in 1948. He served as a justice of the Nevada Supreme Court from 1965 until 1977.

On May 1, 1967, Judge Zenoff presided over the wedding of Elvis and Priscilla Presley. He also presided over the divorce between Eddie Fisher and Debbie Reynolds.

Judge Zenoff helped found the juvenile justice system in Clark County, Nevada and the county juvenile detention center (David Zenoff Hall) is named after him.

His spouse was Beverly Banks. They had three children.

He retired to La Costa in Carlsbad, California, and died in the Scripps Hospital in Encinitas.

References

1916 births
2005 deaths
United States Marine Corps officers
United States Marine Corps personnel of World War II
Military personnel from Nevada
Military personnel from Wisconsin
Justices of the Nevada Supreme Court
People from Carlsbad, California
People from Amherst, Wisconsin
University of Wisconsin Law School alumni
20th-century American judges
Military personnel from California
Chief Justices of the Nevada Supreme Court